Christoph Schmid (born 8 July 1976) is a German politician for the SPD and since 2021 member of the Bundestag, the federal diet.

Life and politics 

Schmid was born 1976 in the West German city of Munich and studied. 

He was elected to the Bundestag in 2021.

References 

Living people
1976 births
People from Munich
Social Democratic Party of Germany politicians
Members of the Bundestag 2021–2025
21st-century German politicians